Bernardo Andrés Campos Araniba (born 23 April 1991) is a Chilean footballer who plays as striker. His last club was Deportes Valdivia.

Titles

Club
Universidad Católica
 Primera División de Chile (1): 2010

External links
cruzados profile

1991 births
Living people
Chilean footballers
Club Deportivo Universidad Católica footballers
Association football forwards